20th Anniversary B-side collection is the twelfth compilation album by Japanese singer Shizuka Kudo. It was released in honor of Kudo's 20th anniversary on March 5, 2008, through Pony Canyon.

Background
The compilation album was released as the third and final release celebrating Kudo's 20th anniversary of her solo debut. The compilation includes thirty-four out of forty of Kudo's B-sides released since her solo debut single "Kindan no Telepathy" (1987), all the way to "Amayo no Tsuki ni" (2007). Some of the songs were previously included on studio albums and other compilations, while others are making their first appearance on a proper album.

The limited edition of the album comes with a DVD including a digest of eight songs performed on Kudo's Shibuya-AX concert held on August 31, 2007 in celebration of her 20th anniversary.

Commercial performance
20th Anniversary B-side collection debuted at number 94 on the Oricon Albums Chart, where it charted for only one week, selling 2,000 copies sold.

Track listing

Charts

References

External links
 20th Anniversary B-side collection on Pony Canyon's official website

2008 compilation albums
Shizuka Kudo albums
Pony Canyon compilation albums